Eragon (stylized in all lowercase) is a 2006 action-fantasy film directed by Stefen Fangmeier (in his directorial debut) and written by Peter Buchman, loosely based on Christopher Paolini’s 2002 novel of the same name. It stars Ed Speleers in the title role as well as Jeremy Irons, Sienna Guillory, Robert Carlyle, Djimon Hounsou, Garrett Hedlund, Joss Stone and John Malkovich, with Rachel Weisz as the voice of Saphira the dragon. The film also marked the film debuts for Speleers and Stone.

Principal photography took place at the Mafilm Fót Studios in Hungary, starting on August 1, 2005. Visual effects and animation were by Industrial Light & Magic and Weta Digital. Eragon was released worldwide between December 13, 2006 and December 15, 2006 by 20th Century Fox. It received widespread negative reviews from critics and book fans, who criticized its acting, screenplay, visuals and unfaithfulness to the source material, though its CGI and the performances of Speleers and Irons were praised by a few critics. It was the 10th worst reviewed film of 2006 on Rotten Tomatoes, but the 31st highest-grossing film of 2006 in the US. The film was released for home entertainment on March 20, 2007. Originally, Eragon was supposed to be the first in a franchise based on Paolini's Inheritance Cycle book series with Fangmeirer shooting both Eldest and Brisingr back-to-back. However, following the poor critical reception of Eragon on its release, and its box-office performance, all the planned sequels were cancelled.

Plot

Arya, elf princess of Ellesméra, flees with a strange stone, pursued by Durza, a dark sorcerer under king Galbatorix. When Durza corners Arya, she uses magic to teleport the stone away.

Eragon, a farm boy living in the country of Alagaësia with his uncle Garrow and cousin Roran, is hunting for deer when he witnesses the stone appearing. Hoping to trade it for food, Eragon brings the stone home but realises it is actually an egg when a blue dragon hatches from it. As he touches the dragon, a magical mark appears on his palm. Several people are shown reacting to this incident, including Arya, Brom, and Galbatorix himself.

Eragon shelters and feeds the dragon, and he teaches her to fly as she gradually grows to full size. She speaks to him through their thoughts and calls herself Saphira. When they are out, Durza's monstrous minions, the Ra'zac, arrive at the village to look for the dragon and the rider, killing Eragon's uncle in the process. Blaming Saphira for his uncle's death, Eragon sends her away. Brom shows up, takes Eragon away from the village, warns him of Saphira's importance, and urges him to call her back. Eragon calls Saphira with his thoughts, and she comes back, forgiving him for what he previously said.

Brom is leading the group to the Varden, rebel freedom fighters opposing Galbatorix. On the way, Brom fills Eragon in on the knowledge of dragon riders, Galbatorix, Durza, and the Ra'zac. He also trains Eragon in sword-fighting. In a small village, Eragon meets a fortune-teller named Angela, who tells him of a girl awaiting his help and of his dangerous path ahead. When Brom and Eragon are attacked by Galbatorix's servants, the Urgals, Eragon attempts to mimic Brom and wipes out the whole group with a magic attack of blue fire, before falling unconscious from the strain. Saphira saves him. Brom teaches Eragon to control his magic and bond his powers with Saphira. After flying for the first time, Eragon and Saphira help Brom kill the Ra'zac, and Brom reveals he was once a rider, his dragon killed by Morzan, a rogue rider allied with Galbatorix.

Durza sets a trap for Eragon, using Arya as bait. Hearing her telepathic calls, Eragon finds her, but is ambushed by Durza. Eragon is outmatched, and Brom arrives to help him, though he gets mortally wounded in the process. In a fit of rage, Eragon vengefully shoots an arrow into Durza's head, causing him to disappear. The trio escapes, and Brom dies of his wounds while flying on Saphira. Eragon takes possession of Brom's sword, Zar'roc, which previously belonged to Morzan.

Eragon confronts a hooded figure that has been following them. That figure reveals himself to be Murtagh, and guides them to the Varden. Once there, Murtagh is imprisoned by the Varden for being Morzan's son. Soon after, Durza and his men surround the rebel camp. Eragon, Saphira, Arya, and the Varden prepare for battle and fight off Galbatorix's forces. Murtagh frees himself during the battle and assists the Varden, saving the Dwarf King Hrothgar and proving his trustworthiness. Eragon and Saphira duel in the skies with Durza who rides his own beast. They eventually kill him, but Saphira is heavily injured. Eragon uses magic to heal her and once again passes out from the strain.

The following morning, Eragon awakes with Murtagh at his side. He fears Saphira may be dead but finds her fully healed. They catch up with Arya, who is on her way to Ellesméra to lead the elves in the coming war against Galbatorix. She calls Eragon “The great Shadeslayer”, and they part ways, promising they will meet again.

Meanwhile, in his castle, a furious Galbatorix slashes at his hanging map of Alagaësia, revealing his immense pitch black dragon, Shruikan.

Cast

 Ed Speleers as Eragon
 Jeremy Irons as Brom
 Sienna Guillory as Arya
 Robert Carlyle as Durza
 Rachel Weisz as the voice of Saphira
 John Malkovich as Galbatorix
 Garrett Hedlund as Murtagh
 Alun Armstrong as Garrow
 Chris Egan as Roran
 Gary Lewis as Hrothgar
 Djimon Hounsou as Ajihad
 Richard Rifkin as Horst
 Steve Speirs as Sloan
 Joss Stone as Angela
 Caroline Chikezie as Nasuada
 Matt Devere as Tall Soldier

Production

Development
Plans to create a film based on Christopher Paolini's best-selling novel were first announced in February 2004. 20th Century Fox purchased the rights to Eragon. Screenwriter Peter Buchman, whose credits included Jurassic Park III, wrote the screenplay. Buchman, a fan of fantasy and science fiction literature and films, says he was "blown away" by the author's precociousness, his mastery of plot lines and characters, and his ability to create several completely imaginary worlds.

Casting

Speleers was selected for the title role after a worldwide casting search. "Ed came in [to the casting session], and we just looked at each other and said, "That's Eragon, that's the guy from the book," said director Stefen Fangmeier: "I got a strong sense of Ed's sparkle, of his life. It's the kind of thing where you just know he's destined to become a movie star. Speleers won the role as he was trying to learn his lines for a school production of Hamlet. Others considered for the role included Alex Pettyfer but since production took place in central Europe and Pettyfer is afraid of flying, he declined the role.

On July 15, 2005, in an official press release from 20th Century Fox, it was confirmed that Speleers had signed on to the project. Over the following months, Jeremy Irons, John Malkovich, Chris Egan, and Djimon Hounsou were all confirmed as joining the Eragon cast. Paolini, author of the original novel, had expressed his wishes to be featured in a cameo role in the film — specifically, as a warrior who is beheaded in the battle of Farthen Dûr. However, he was unable because of his European book tour.

Jeremy Irons, who welcomed the opportunity to reintroduce himself to younger audiences, took on the role although Dungeons & Dragons (a previous fantasy film he had acted in) had flopped, and he said that he thought that Eragon "had been better managed" than that film.

Filming

In August 2005, Fox began filming Eragon at various locations throughout Hungary and Slovakia, including:
 Pilisborosjenő, Budapest Metropolitan Area, Hungary
 Budapest, Hungary
 Ság-hegy, Hungary
 Celldömölk, Hungary
 High Tatras, Slovakia

Filming ended a month later in September, beginning the film's post-production stage, with Industrial Light and Magic creating the film's CGI.

The decision was made later on in production to add feathers to the standard bat-like wings of the dragon Saphira. The studio had been inspired by the Angel's wings in X-Men: The Last Stand. Jean Bolte, lead viewpaint artist for ILM on the film, calls them "skethers" (half-feathers, half-scales) and was inspired by the scales of the pangolin. It was eventually decided that Saphira's colors scheme should be subdued rather than vibrant in order to be more realistic.

Music

The score for the film was composed by Patrick Doyle who also created the score of 2005's Harry Potter and the Goblet of Fire. Avril Lavigne also recorded the film's theme song, entitled "Keep Holding On", which was featured in the credits and on the soundtrack. The track was released as a single in 2006 (and later as a track on her 2007 album The Best Damn Thing) and reached 17 on Billboard Hot 100 singles chart in America.

Track listing
 "Eragon"
 "Roran Leaves"
 "Saphira's First Flight"
 "Ra'zac"
 "Burning Farm"
 "Fortune Teller"
 "If You Were Flying"
 "Brom's Story"
 "Durza"
 "Passing the Flame"
 "Battle for Varden"
 "Together"
 "Saphira Returns"
 "Legend of Eragon"
 "Keep Holding On" – Avril Lavigne
 "Once in Every Lifetime" – Jem

Distribution

Video game

The video game based on the motion picture was developed by Stormfront Studios and Amaze Entertainment and was released in November 2006.

Home media
Eragon was released DVD and Blu-ray in the US on March 20, 2007. It debuted at number 1 on the national DVD sales charts and at number 3 on the DVD rental charts. It grossed more than US$35.2 million in rentals. It was released on DVD in Europe on April 16, 2007 and in Australia on April 18, 2007.

Reception

Critical response

On the review aggregator Rotten Tomatoes, Eragon holds an approval rating of 16% based on 125 reviews, with an average rating of 4.08/10. The consensus reads "Eragon is a fantasy epic that lacks any magic, brought down to earth by unconvincing world-building and a litany of stars who seem bemused by the material." The Seattle Times described the film as "technically accomplished, but fairly lifeless and at times a bit silly". The Hollywood Reporter said the world of Eragon was "without much texture or depth." The story was labeled "derivative" by The Washington Post, and "generic" by the Las Vegas Weekly. Newsday stressed this point further, asserting that only "nine-year-olds with no knowledge whatsoever of any of the six Star Wars movies would find the film original."

The acting was called "lame" by the Washington Post, plus "stilted" and "lifeless" by the Orlando Weekly. The dialogue was also criticized, with MSNBC labelling it "silly"; the Las Vegas Weekly called it "wooden". Positive reviews described the film as "fun" and "the stuff boys' fantasies are made of." The CGI work was called "imaginative" and Saphira was called a "magnificent creation." Christopher Paolini stated he enjoyed the film, particularly praising the performances of Jeremy Irons and Ed Speleers.

Box office
Eragon grossed approximately $75 million in the US and $173.9 million elsewhere, grossing $249 million worldwide. Director Stefen Fangmeier believes that Fox was "modestly happy with the worldwide box office."

Eragon was in release for 17 weeks in the US, opening on December 15, 2006 and closing on April 8, 2007. It opened in 3020 theaters, earning $8.7 million on opening day and $23.2 million across opening weekend, ranked 2nd behind The Pursuit of Happyness. Eragon's second weekend US box office dropped by almost 70%, possibly due to the opening of Night at the Museum, another family film from 20th Century Fox, the 41st biggest second weekend drop since this statistic was kept. Eragon's $75 million total US gross was the 31st highest for 2006.

The film earned $150 million in its opening weekend across 76 overseas markets, making it the #1 film worldwide. This was attributed to the sheer scope of Eragons global launch as the film ranked number 1 in fewer than half of the overseas territories it was released in. The foreign box office competition for the film's opening week was "soft;" had Eragon been released one year earlier, it would have been placed fourth. Eragons UK opening was "a disappointment," in Australia it was "solid if unimpressive," but its most impressive market was France, where the film earned more than $21 million. The film's $249 million total worldwide gross was the 16th highest for 2006.
Eragon grossed $86,995,160 on DVD from March 20, 2007 – May 13, 2007.

Accolades
 Saturn Awards (2007)
 Nominated: Best Fantasy Film
 Nominated: Best Performance by a Younger Actor - Edward Speleers
 CDG Award (Costume Designers Guild) (2007)
 Nominated: Excellence in Costume Design for Film (Fantasy) - Kym Barrett

Reboot
Around 2021, 15 years after the film’s premiere, fans of the book series tweeted #EragonRemake in an effort to get Disney, the intellectual rights holders following their acquisition of 21st Century Fox, to revamp the book series into a possible television show for Disney+. Within hours, the hashtag began to trend with fans pushing for a proper adaptation. When Paolini found out about this movement, he encouraged the fans to keep at it and even joined it himself.

On July 25, 2022, Variety reported that a live action television series adaptation of Eragon was in early development for Disney+, with Paolini serving as a co-writer on the series, and with Bert Salke executive producing.

References

External links

 
 
 
 
 
 

2006 films
2000s fantasy action films
American fantasy action films
American coming-of-age films
American fantasy films
British coming-of-age films
British fantasy films
20th Century Fox films
Davis Entertainment films
Dune Entertainment films
20th Century Studios franchises
American children's fantasy films
American fantasy adventure films
Films about dragons
Films based on American novels
Films based on fantasy novels
Films produced by John Davis
Films scored by Patrick Doyle
Films shot at Pinewood Studios
Films shot in British Columbia
Films shot in Budapest
Films shot in Hungary
Films shot in Slovakia
High fantasy films
Inheritance Cycle
Sword and sorcery films
Films with screenplays by Peter Buchman
2006 directorial debut films
Films produced by Wyck Godfrey
2000s English-language films
2000s American films
2000s British films